Struga Goleniowska is a river of Poland, a tributary of the Ina that meets the Ina at the town of Goleniów.

Rivers of Poland
Rivers of West Pomeranian Voivodeship